The School of Hotel and Tourism Management (SHTM) is one of the schools at The Hong Kong Polytechnic University (PolyU). It was established in 1979 as the Department of Institutional Management and Catering Studies, then renamed as Department of Hotel and Tourism Management in 1992. The department was designated a school in October 2001, which became an independent autonomous academic unit within the university structure in July 2004.

The SHTM offers programmes from undergraduate degrees to doctoral degrees. In 2012, the SHTM received the McCool Breakthrough Award from the International Council on Hotel, Restaurant, and Institutional Education (I-CHRIE) for its teaching and research hotel, Hotel ICON. The School is currently an Affiliate Member of the United Nations World Tourism Organisation (UNWTO).

Programmes
The SHTM offers programmes at levels ranging from Bachelor’s degree to Ph.D. in Hong Kong and Mainland China:

 Programmes in Hong Kong
Doctor of Philosophy (Ph.D.) in Hotel and Tourism Management
Doctor of Hotel and Tourism Management (D.HTM)
Master of Science (MSc) in Global Hospitality Business
MSc in International Hospitality Management
MSc in International Tourism and Convention Management
MSc in International Wine Management
MSc in Hospitality Business Innovation (online programme)
MicroMasters in International Hospitality Management (online programme)
Bachelor of Science (Hons) Scheme in Hotel and Tourism Management

 Programmes in Mainland China
Doctor of Hotel and Tourism Management (D.HTM) (in cooperation with Zhejiang University)
Master of Science (MSc) in Hotel and Tourism Management (in cooperation with Zhejiang University)

Awards and Recognitions 
2022 – Ranked No.1 in Asia in the "Hospitality and Leisure Management" category for the sixth year in a row, according to QS World University Rankings by Subject 2022
2022 – Ranked No.1 in the world, according to ShanghaiRanking’s Global Ranking of Academic Subjects for the sixth year in a row 
2021/22 – Placed No. 1 globally in the “Commerce, Management, Tourism and Services” category in the University Ranking by Academic Performance for five consecutive years
2020 - MSc in Global Hospitality Business selected by I-CHRIE as the recipient of the 2020 McCool Breakthrough Award
2017 – Ranked No. 1 in the world in the “Hospitality, Leisure, Sport & Tourism” subject area by the CWUR Rankings by Subject
2017 – Professor Haiyan Song conferred the title Mr and Mrs Chan Chak Fu Professor in International Tourism
2015 – Dean Kaye Chon conferred the title Walter & Wendy Kwok Family Foundation Professor in International Hospitality Management
2012 – Bestowed the McCool Breakthrough Award  by I-CHRIE, recognising the School’s achievement with Hotel ICON
2011 - Dean Kaye Chon received the UNWTO Ulysses Prize
2009 – Ranked No. 2 in the world among the global top hospitality and tourism programmes according to a study published in the November 2009 issue of the  Journal of Hospitality and Tourism Research.
2005 – Ranked No. 4 in world-ranking based on research and scholarship, according to a study published in the August issue of the Journal of Hospitality and Tourism Research.
2003 - Recognised by the International Society of Travel and Tourism Educators (ISTTE) with an “ISTTE Institutional Achievement Award”
2002 – Rated among world’s top 15 programmes in research and scholarship by the Journal of Hospitality and Tourism Education. In the same year, the School was chosen by the International Academy for the Study of Tourism (IAST) as the home of its permanent secretariat.
2001 – Became one of the first educational institutions to receive the UNWTO TedQual Certification, a quality assurance system for tourism education, training, and research.
1999 - Designated by the UNWTO as one of its global Education and Training Network Centres.
1992 – Accepted as an Affiliate Member of the UNWTO
1989 – Recognised by I-CHRIE as an Institutional Member

Facilities 
Hotel ICON

Officially opened on 21 September 2011, Hotel ICON (唯港薈) is the teaching and research hotel built for the SHTM by PolyU. It was built on the site of Pak Sui Yuen (百粹苑), the former PolyU's staff quarters. Wholly owned by PolyU and an extension of the SHTM, Hotel ICON has a total of 262 guestrooms including three dedicated "Tomorrow's Guestrooms" reserved for innovations and advance research.

Mr and Mrs Chan Chak Fu Building

The building that houses the School was named after the late Mr and Mrs Chan Chak Fu, a pioneer Hong Kong hotelier, in appreciation for the contributions by Seal of Love Charitable Foundation Limited to support PolyU's development and advancement in hospitality and tourism education and research.

Gallery of Honour

Located in the SHTM lobby, the Gallery of Honour displays portraits of the recipients of the SHTM Lifetime Achievement Award. The School established this award to honour individuals who have contributed substantially to the development of hospitality and tourism in Hong Kong, Asia, and the world.

 SHTM Lifetime Achievement Award Recipients
 2016 – Mr. Adrian Zecha, Founder of Aman Resorts
 2017 – The Honourable Sir Michael Kadoorie, Chairman of The Hong Kong and Shanghai Hotels Limited and Chairman of CLP Holdings Limited
 2018 – Thanpuying Chanut Piyaoui, Founder and Honorary Chairman of Dusit International
 2019 – Mr. P. R. S. Oberoi, Executive Chairman of EIH Limited, the flagship company of The Oberoi Group
2020 – Mr Robert H. Burns, Founder of Regent International Hotels

Tan Siu Lin Innovation Hub

Equipped with state-of-the-art digital equipment and specialised software for the industry, the Tan Siu Lin Innovation Hub  provides an inspirational and flexible learning environment in which students are empowered to reach their full potentials. It ensures that SHTM students have experience using the latest technology available in the industry.

Student Hub

An open and innovative communal space, the Student Hub  plays a key role in promoting the interaction and integration of students from different cultures. It is not only an ideal venue for hosting student events, but also an exciting space for students to connect with peers from diverse backgrounds, and to develop their ability to become more open-minded in embracing cultural differences.

Che-woo Lui Hotel and Tourism Resource Centre

Designed to support the research, teaching and learning functions of the SHTM, the Che-woo Lui Hotel and Tourism Resource Centre  is a comprehensive repository of reference and teaching materials in hotel and tourism management subject areas. It is also equipped with facilities for student discussion, group projects and seminars.

Bistro 1979

Bistro 1979  is a student-operated restaurant providing a real restaurant setting for SHTM students to learn and experience the actual food and beverage management and operation. The restaurant has a capacity of 66 people and includes main and exclusive dining areas for its members and guests.

Vinoteca Lab

Vinoteca Lab is a wine lab used for a variety of classes ranging from basic wine fundamentals to advanced regional and international wine knowledge and specialist skills. It also hosts a variety of other classes, including wine appreciation, food and wine pairing, creative mixology, and coffee art, which are open to students, industry representatives, and the general public. Workshops organised by the Food and Wine Academy, an initiative by the SHTM and Hotel ICON, take place in this lab.

The Food and Wine Academy

The Food and Wine Academy is a joint initiative of the SHTM and Hotel ICON, offering series of short, jointly developed workshops and courses for food and wine enthusiasts, ranging from basic to advanced levels. Through the academy, participants can gradually build a comprehensive portfolio of knowledge and skills in a practical, applied modern environment, while simultaneously enhancing their understanding, familiarity with, and enjoyment of current and future culinary trends and regional wines.

The Western Food Production Lab

The Western Food Production Lab allows students to practise and learn about food production, food hygiene and safety. Workshops organised by the Food and Wine Academy also take place here.

Research and Consultancies 
Hospitality and Tourism Research Centre

Established by the SHTM, the Hospitality and Tourism Research Centre is dedicated to bridging the gap between hospitality and tourism theory and industry practice. The Centre is a research-based platform with a network of hospitality and tourism academics from our School and partner institutions, as well as executives from industry organisations. It supports academic research for the advancement of hospitality and tourism knowledge on topics of importance to industry performance and the future.

The SHTM+ICON Consultancy

SHTM+ICON Consultancy is a business unit under the auspices of the PolyU Technology & Consultancy Co. Ltd. (PTeC), which is a wholly-owned subsidiary of PolyU. The mission of the consultancy is the transfer of knowledge, accumulated from the SHTM's research and Hotel ICON's practical endeavours, to the hospitality industry and educational institutes. The services offered include: Hospitality Management, Hospitality Development, Executive Education in Hospitality and Other Service Industries, and Higher Education in Hospitality.

References

External links

Hong Kong Polytechnic University
Hospitality schools in Hong Kong
Business schools in Hong Kong